Ascalenia callynella is a moth in the family Cosmopterigidae. It is found in Egypt, the United Arab Emirates, Iran and Israel.

The larvae feed on Tamarix species.

References

Moths described in 1968
Ascalenia
Moths of Asia
Moths of Africa